The Assembly of God Church is a school in the city of Kolkata. Established in the year 1964 with moderate beginnings. The school is affiliated to the CISCE board (Council for the Indian School Certificate Examinations).

History 
In 1954 a young missionary couple, Mark & Huldah Buntain obeyed the call of God on their lives and travelled by ship from Canada to Kolkata (then Calcutta), India. From the onset of their ministry, the Buntains faithfully proclaimed Jesus and reflected his light through acts of compassion. Moved by the plight of the city's poor and homeless children Pastor Buntain set up the first Assembly of God Church School in Kolkata at Park Street in 1964. Pastor Buntain's great love & compassion for the poor led to the setting up of a feeding program which provided daily nutritious meals for those struggling for survival on the streets and in the slums of Kolkata.

Insight into the School 
The administrative office and senior section of the school is located at Park Street, while the junior section is located at Royd Street. 

The school emphasizes on academic, co curricular and spiritual training. The unique feature of this school is its morning chapel. The discipline is quite strict and methodical. The campus is quite spacious. Classrooms airy and clean corridors. The teaching staffs and non teaching staffs are very cooperative. One gets to hear success stories from overseas guests and alumni. There is an active alumni association too.

This school has a large batch size with 130+ students taking the Class 10 examination. The average score was 77.14%. The school offers 10 subjects to students (Students need to take 6 subjects: Typically, English, second language, Mathematics, Science, Social Studies + 1 elective (optional)).

The school also takes active part in keeping Kolkata green and arranges a number of nature projects. The school also organises various inter-house competitions which include debates, elocution, sports and so on.

Greenathon 
The annual fest of the school is ‘Greenathon – Our Dream Kolkata Green’. The school endeavours to provide a vibrant forum to interact with the students and to create young environmental catalysts that would become the future ‘change agents’. It started in the year 2011.

The school received the PlanetPoints Planet-friendly event certification, for its efforts in organising Greenathon 2014 in the greenest way possible, Mr. Victor Singh, the School Principal and the chief guests planted saplings in the school premises and marking the beginning of the signature Mini-Marathon (of approx. 2.8 km) in the heart of the city. This event is held every year and is participated by other major schools of the city and also celebrities.

Notable alumni 
 Mir Afsar Ali
 Gaurav Chakrabarty
 Arjun Chakrabarty
 Hindol Sengupta
 Koushani Mukherjee

References

External links
 https://timesofindia.indiatimes.com/times-school-survey-your-ultimate-guide-for-the-best-schools-in-kolkata/articleshow/67324352.cms
 http://agkolkata.org
 http://www.thelearningpoint.net/home/school-listings/icse-isc-2/ASSEMBLY-OF-GOD-CHURCH-SCHOOL--PARK-ST---KOLKATA
 http://agcsalumni.org/

Primary schools in West Bengal

High schools and secondary schools in West Bengal
Christian schools in West Bengal
Schools in Kolkata
Educational institutions established in 1964
1964 establishments in West Bengal